Tagetes moorei is a Mexican species of marigolds in the family Asteraceae.

It is endemic to the states of Hidalgo and Querétaro in central Mexico.

Description
Tagetes moorei is an perennial herb up to 30 cm (12 inches) tall. Leaves are highly divided, up to 2.5 cm (1.0 inches) long.

Flower heads are yellow, each containing about 8 ray florets and 40 or more disc florets.

References

External links

moorei
Endemic flora of Mexico
Flora of Hidalgo (state)
Flora of Querétaro
Plants described in 1973